The Military Academy (AM; Academia Militar in Portuguese) is a Portuguese military establishment, which has the ability to confer educational qualifications equivalent to a university. It develops activities of teaching, research and support for the communities with the purpose of training and forming officers for the Portuguese Army and the Republican National Guard.

History
The Military Academy has this designation since 1959, but the first such establishment occurred in 1640 when the Military Higher Education was created.

Campus
Currently, the Portuguese Military Academy is located in two different barracks, a main one in Lisbon's Bemposta Palace and a detachment in Amadora.

Academics

Army graduation programs
 Master in military sciences, Cavalry  (5 years)
 Master in military sciences, Infantry (5 years)
 Master in military sciences, Artillery (5 years)
 Master in military sciences, Military administration (5 years)
 Master in military engineering, Engineering (7 years)
 Master in military electrical engineering, Communications (7 years)
 Master in military electrical engineering, Materiel (7 years)
 Master in military mechanical engineering, Materiel (7 years)
 Master in military health, Medicine (7 years)
 Master in military health, Veterinary medicine (7 years)
 Master in military health, Pharmacological sciences (7 years)

National Republican Guard graduation programs
 Master in military sciences, Arms for the National Republican Guard (5 years)
 Master in military sciences, Administration for National Republican Guard (5 years)
 Master in military engineering, Engineering for National Republican Guard (7 years)
 Master in military health, Medicine for the National Republican Guard (7 years)
 Master in military health, Veterinary medicine for the National Republican Guard (7 years)

Gallery

See also
Higher education in Portugal
National Republican Guard
Portugal

External links
Military Academy

Portuguese Army
Higher education in Portugal
Military units and formations established in 1640
Education in Lisbon
Military academies of Portugal
1640 establishments in Portugal

Military of Portugal
Military installations in Portugal